Journal of Non-Crystalline Solids is a biweekly peer-reviewed scientific journal covering research on amorphous materials, such as glass. It was founded in 1968 and it is published by Elsevier. The current editors-in-chief are Barrett G. Potter (University of Arizona), Edgar Dutra Zanotto (Universidade Federal de São Carlos) and Josef W. Zwanziger (Dalhousie University).

Abstracting and indexing
Journal of Non-Crystalline Solids is indexed in:

Chemical Abstracts Service - CASSI
Web of Science
 
According to the Journal Citation Reports, the journal has a 2019 impact factor of 2.600.

References

Chemistry journals
Elsevier academic journals
English-language journals
Biweekly journals
Publications established in 1968